Hasely Joachim Crawford TC (born 16 August 1950) is a former track and field athlete from Trinidad and Tobago. In 1976, he became his country's first Olympic champion.  A stadium was renamed in his honour in 2001.

Early years
Crawford was born in San Fernando, Trinidad and Tobago, one of the eleven children of Lionel Crawford and Phyllis Holder, and began pursuing athletics at the age of 17. He is a six-time Trinidad and Tobago 100 metres champion, and won the 200 metre title in 1976. He debuted internationally in 1970, winning a bronze medal in the 100 metres at the Commonwealth Games. Only two years later, he surprisingly qualified for the 100 metres final of the Olympics in Munich, but pulled his hamstring after 20 metres and failed to finish.

Athletic career
Crawford ran for Eastern Michigan University under coach Bob Parks during his college years.
He was the runner up at the 1975 Pan American Games in the 100 metres. His coach prepared him for the 100 metres and 200 metres events at the 1976 Summer Olympics with a strategy of only allowing him to run in a few races during the season. This tactic paid off, as Crawford, in the inside lane 1, narrowly won the 100 metres final in a time of 10.06 seconds, just 0.02 seconds in front of Don Quarrie of Jamaica, winning Trinidad and Tobago's first Olympic gold medal. He had also qualified for the 200 metres final, but was forced to pull out mid-race after injuring his pelvis

After these Games, Crawford met with further success, winning the 100 metres event at the Central American and Caribbean Championships in 1977. On returning home, Hasely Crawford had both a jet and a stadium named after him.  During his reign as the 100 metre Olympic champion, he also appeared on postage stamps and was awarded Trinidad and Tobago's highest honour, Trinity Cross, in 1978. This award was changed to the Order of the Republic of Trinidad and Tobago. Crawford went on to compete in a total of four Olympic Games as he also represented T&T at both the Moscow and Los Angeles editions in 1980 and 1984, but was unable to qualify for another final. Crawford's last international medals were a bronze and a silver which he won at the 1978 Commonwealth Games in the 100 metres and the 4x100 metres relay respectively. In 2000, he was named the Trinidad & Tobago Athlete of the Millennium.  He is a member of the Caribbean Hall of Fame, along with Ato Boldon and Arthur Wint, one of only three track and field athletes to be inducted.

Personal best marks
 50 m: 5.78 (indoor, February 1979, Ottawa) 
 100 m: 10.06 s (July 1976, Montreal) 
 200 m: 20.93 s (June 1977, London)

References

External links 

Sunday Guardian, September 17, 2000 Page 21

1950 births
Living people
Trinidad and Tobago male sprinters
Olympic athletes of Trinidad and Tobago
Olympic gold medalists for Trinidad and Tobago
Athletes (track and field) at the 1972 Summer Olympics
Athletes (track and field) at the 1976 Summer Olympics
Athletes (track and field) at the 1980 Summer Olympics
Athletes (track and field) at the 1984 Summer Olympics
Pan American Games silver medalists for Trinidad and Tobago
Pan American Games medalists in athletics (track and field)
Athletes (track and field) at the 1975 Pan American Games
Commonwealth Games medallists in athletics
Athletes (track and field) at the 1970 British Commonwealth Games
Athletes (track and field) at the 1978 Commonwealth Games
Athletes (track and field) at the 1982 Commonwealth Games
Eastern Michigan Eagles men's track and field athletes
Recipients of the Trinity Cross
Medalists at the 1976 Summer Olympics
Commonwealth Games silver medallists for Trinidad and Tobago
Commonwealth Games bronze medallists for Trinidad and Tobago
Olympic gold medalists in athletics (track and field)
Central American and Caribbean Games gold medalists for Trinidad and Tobago
Competitors at the 1978 Central American and Caribbean Games
People from San Fernando, Trinidad and Tobago
USA Indoor Track and Field Championships winners
Central American and Caribbean Games medalists in athletics
Medalists at the 1975 Pan American Games
Medallists at the 1970 British Commonwealth Games
Medallists at the 1978 Commonwealth Games